Velikiye Luki Airport  is a suspended airport in Russia located  northeast of Velikiye Luki.

From the mid-1920s until 1936 it was used as a stopover airport by the Soviet-German airline Deruluft en route between Berlin and Moscow.

Until the mid-1990s it was used to accommodate small civilian airliners servicing regional scheduled flights.

In 2020 a discussion on resuming flights took place with the governor of Pskov oblast.

References

RussianAirFields.com

Defunct airports
Airports built in the Soviet Union
Airports in Pskov Oblast